Stephen Francis Sidebotham  (1935 - 2021) was Dean of Hong Kong from 1976 until 1982; and then again from 2003 to 2005.

He was educated at Queens' College, Cambridge and ordained in 1961. After curacies in Southampton and Hong Kong he was Vicar of Christ Church, Kowloon before his first spell as Dean; and Rector of Gravesend between his first and second spell.

References

1935 births
Alumni of Queens' College, Cambridge
Deans of Hong Kong
Living people
Hong Kong Sheng Kung Hui clergy